McJohnston Chapel and Cemetery is a historic chapel and cemetery located in Center Township, Vanderburgh County, Indiana. It was built in 1880, and is a small Gothic Revival style, rectangular red brick building.  It has a projecting vestibule topped by a bell tower and steeple.  Adjacent to the chapel is the cemetery, with the oldest gravestone dated to 1819.  It is the oldest cemetery in Vanderburgh County that remain in use.

It was added to the National Register of Historic Places in 1979.

References

External links

 

Churches on the National Register of Historic Places in Indiana
Cemeteries on the National Register of Historic Places in Indiana
Gothic Revival architecture in Indiana
Churches completed in 1880
1819 establishments in Indiana
Churches in Vanderburgh County, Indiana
National Register of Historic Places in Vanderburgh County, Indiana